Louis Anthony Rossmann (born November 19, 1988) is an American independent repair technician, YouTuber, and right to repair activist. He is the owner and operator of Rossmann Repair Group in Austin, Texas (formerly New York City), a computer repair shop established in 2007 which specializes in logic board-level repair of MacBooks. 

Rossmann rose in popularity with his YouTube channel showing his repairs to provide as an educational resource, frequently live streaming repairs on YouTube and Vimeo. On his YouTube channel, he also uploads tutorials on life, business practices, real estate, and right to repair videos. He also owns a channel on Odysee, uploading the same content there and on his YouTube channel. Rossmann has actively campaigned for right to repair legislation to be passed in multiple city and state legislatures. In August 2022, Rossmann announced his move to Austin, Texas, to work for tech independence organization FUTO; the repair business will follow in 2023.

Campaigns
On October 8, 2018, CBC News ran an investigative piece on Apple's business practices surrounding repair of their devices. They went undercover in an Apple store with a malfunctioning MacBook Pro looking for a quote on repair. They explained that the screen was simply black and they couldn't see anything on the screen. The Apple store quoted a customer in their undercover video $1200 for a logic board replacement, explaining that the liquid contact indicators (LCIs) had turned red and would only be that way when in contact with any type of liquid. They concluded the whole logic board needed to be swapped out, in addition to the top case. When taken to Rossmann's repair shop, Rossmann explained that there was no liquid damage, and that simple room humidity likely set off the LCIs. He also explained that a pin that connected the MacBook Pro's backlight was simply not seated properly. After seating the pin properly, the MacBook Pro was seen working again. Rossmann explained his repair shop would likely not charge for simply re-seating the backlight pin.

He has also spoken and testified in right to repair hearings in Boston, Maine, Washington state, and Nebraska.

Rossmann has also appeared in right to repair campaigns related to farming machinery in Nebraska in March 2020. Though he was initially completely against any form of curbs imposed by companies on farmers from repairing their equipment (which might have resulted in voiding the equipment's warranty), he later admitted that his opinions were not completely correct due to him lacking expertise in the field of farming machinery when he received  mail from a John Deere employee regarding how allowing farmers to tune their tractors can result in harm to themselves and possible violation of environmental laws.

Rossmann has criticized the design of the third-generation MacBook Air. He notes that the fan is not positioned above the CPU, nor connected to it via any radiator circuit, calling it a "placebo fan" which can easily lead to overheating and damage.

In March 2021, Rossmann started a crowdfunding campaign to raise $6 million using the GoFundMe platform in order to start a direct ballot initiative to protect consumer right to repair in the state of Massachusetts, citing previous similar successes in the automotive industry. As of July 2021, the campaign has raised over $750,000.

In order to help right to repair efforts, he created Repair Preservation Group, a right to repair organization. In July 2021, Apple co-founder Steve Wozniak endorsed Rossmann's right-to-repair efforts and called for open sourcing in a Cameo video requested by Rossmann. Wozniak spoke about how electronic devices used to come with schematics, allowing anyone with the expertise to repair, if not improve, their devices, and credited this openness for the success of the Apple II.

Notable videos
On October 18, 2018, Rossmann uploaded a video entitled "Apple & Customs STOLE my batteries, that they won't even provide to AASPs". In the video, Rossmann explains that U.S. Customs seized his package containing 20 Apple MacBook batteries, worth US$1,068, labeling them as counterfeit goods.  He claims the sole reason for the seizure was the batteries he was importing bore Apple's trademark and feels it is retribution for the CBC News piece, as Rossmann had been importing MacBook batteries for years without incident until shortly after the CBC story was published.

In 2018, Rossmann testified as a witness in a lawsuit from Apple towards an independent smartphone repair shop owner in Norway, Henrik Huseby, regarding the right to repair and authorized smartphone parts. The Norwegian court originally sided with Huseby but ruled in favor of Apple in 2019 after an appeal hearing showed Huseby had been using counterfeit parts. On June 5, 2019, Rossmann posted a video on YouTube where he appeared as a key witness in a Norwegian court case, in which Apple Inc. had sued a Norwegian repair shop in an effort to stop them from repairing Apple products. In a June 29 video he explained that the case ended in the court ruled in favor of Apple Inc. as the repair shop in question was using counterfeit parts, a detail Rossmann claims he was not aware of before testifying.

References

External links
 

American computer specialists
Living people
1988 births
YouTube channels
Technology YouTubers
Let's Players
Right to Repair
Activists from New York City
Activists from Texas